The 2016 European Rugby Champions Cup Final was the final match in the 2015–16 European Rugby Champions Cup, and the twenty-first European club rugby final in general.  It was contested by French side Racing 92, and Saracens of England, at the Grand Stade de Lyon, in the Lyon suburb of Décines, France, on Saturday 14 May 2016.

Saracens defeated Racing 92 by 21 points to 9. This was Saracens first European Cup win, making them the first new champions since Toulon, whose first victory in what was then known as the Heineken Cup came in 2013.

Background
Prior to the draw for the 2015–16 tournament, it was announced that Lyon would host the 2015–16 European Rugby Challenge Cup and Champions Cup finals at the newly built Grand Stade de Lyon, while the 2017 finals would be held at Murrayfield Stadium in Edinburgh, Scotland. Two weeks before the match, Nigel Owens was chosen to referee the final. This was Racing's first European Cup final, while Saracens were previously defeated by Toulon in the 2014 Heineken Cup Final. The two teams last met in the tournament the previous season, Saracens having defeated Racing at the quarter-final stage with a last-minute penalty kick.

Route to the final

Note: In all results below, the score of the finalist is given first (H: home; A: away).

Racing 92
In the pool stages, fifth-seeds Racing 92 topped Pool 3, winning four of six games. Their first match with Glasgow Warriors was postponed for two months due to the November 2015 Paris attacks, but they went on to win their first two fixtures. After drawing 9-9 with Northampton Saints and winning the postponed match 34-10, Racing inflicted a heavy 64-14 away defeat on the Scarlets. Racing lost their final match 22-5 away at against the Warriors, which was relocated from Scotstoun Stadium to Rugby Park due to heavy rainfall.

On April 10 in the quarter-finals, Racing hosted Toulon at Stade Yves-du-Manoir and narrowly won by 19-16. Two weeks later, they won in the semi-finals by the same scoreline Leicester Tigers at City Ground in Nottingham, England.

Saracens
Seeded first, Saracens won Pool 1 after winning all six of their matches. In the quarter-finals, they won 29-20 against the Northampton Saints at Allianz Park on 9 April, with tries from Chris Ashton and Chris Wyles. Both were converted by Owen Farrell, who also scored all five of their penalties. Two weeks later, they won their semi-final 24-17 against Wasps at the Madejski Stadium in Reading, England.

Match

Summary

The game was played mostly during a heavy rain storm, and featured no tries. Racing 92's scrum-half Maxime Machenaud missed an early penalty kick, allowing Saracens fly-half Owen Farrell to score first, hitting a drop goal from close range to give the Saracens a 3–0 lead.  After winning a scrum deep in the Saracens half, Racing's outside-centre Johan Goosen drew the score level 3–3 at 17 minutes. Machenaud was removed from play under concussion regulations on 22 minutes. Farrell scored on a two successive penalties to make the score 9–3 in Saracens' favour. Just before the end of the half, Goosen and Farrell traded penalties to make the score 12–6.

Racing's fly-half, Dan Carter was substituted shortly after half-time, having aggravated his leg injury. Farrell scored another penalty early in the second half to extend the lead to 15–6. As Racing became more aggressive following the 60 minute mark, Goosen scored his third penalty of the game to bring the score to 15–9. Farrell would preserve the lead for Saracens, by scoring two more penalties; once in the 76th minute, and once in the 79th minute for a final score of 21–9 in favour of Saracens.

Maro Itoje was named Man of The Match. Saracens became the first team to win the competition by winning all their matches.

Details

Notes

References

Final
2016
Racing 92 matches
Saracens F.C. matches
2015–16 in French rugby union
2015–16 in English rugby union
European Rugby Champions Cup